Pēteris Stučka, sometimes spelt Pyotr Stuchka; ( – 25 January 1932), was a Latvian jurist and communist politician, leader of the pro-Russian Bolshevik puppet government in Latvia during the 1918–1920 Latvian War of Independence, and later a statesman in the Soviet Union.

Biography 
Stučka was born in Latvia, in the Governorate of Livonia (then part of the Russian Empire). His father was a prosperous farmer, his mother was a teacher. He was educated in a German lyceum in Riga, and then St Petersburg University, where he studied law. After graduating in 1888, he returned to Latvia, where he practised as a lawyer, and was one of the leaders of the New Current movement in the late 19th century, a prolific writer and translator, and an editor of Latvian language newspapers and periodicals. He was arrested in 1897, and sentenced to five years exile in Vyatka province, where he was allowed to continue practising law. When the Russian Social Democratic Labour Party split into its Bolshevik and Menshevik factions, Stučka supported the Bolsheviks, who were led by Vladimir Lenin. In 1904, he was one of the organisers of the Latvian Social Democratic Workers' Party, which held its first congress clandestinely in Riga.

After the February Revolution, which overthrew the Tsar, Stučka backed Lenin's April Theses, which called for a second, Bolshevik-led revolution, and organised the detachment of Latvian riflemen who played a crucial role in the October Revolution.

Appointed People's Commissar for Justice in the first Bolshevik government, on 7 November 1917, he was responsible for abolishing all existing judicial institutions, replacing them with local courts consisting of a judge and two assessors, created by local soviets, and for decreeing that existing laws should be treated as valid only where "they are not in contradiction with the revolutionary conscience." In an article published in 1919, he also explained that the soviet imposed punishments on individuals not to exact retribution or expiate individual guilt, but as a measure of social defence against enemies of the revolution.

The result, as Stučka noted in retrospect, was that "from November 1917 to 1922, law was formally lacking."

In February 1918, Stučka returned to Latvia, where he was chairman of the government of the short-lived Latvian soviet republic. According to the writer, Victor Serge, Stučka,

After the collapse of the Latvian communist government in August 1919, Stučka returned permanently to Russia. In 1920-32, he worked in Comintern, as a member, and was chairman of the International Control Commission in 1924-28.

In 1923, Stuchka, was appointed the first Chairman of the USSR Supreme Court. He held this post until his death in 1932.

After his death on January 25, 1932, Stučka's remains were cremated and his ashes amongst those of other Communist dignitaries in the Kremlin Wall Necropolis, near Lenin's Mausoleum in Moscow's Red Square.

Family 
Stučka's wife, Dora Pliekšāne (1870–1950), was the sister of the Latvian poet Rainis (Jānis Pliekšāns), with whom Stučka shared a room during their law studies at St. Petersburg University. Rainis supported socialism, but stressed that national culture was also important. Although Rainis initially supported a free Latvia within a free Russia, he would later support an independent Latvian nation.

Places and organizations named in honour of Stučka 

 During the Soviet period, from 1958 to 1990, the University of Latvia was officially known as Pēteris Stučka Latvian State University.
 The town of Aizkraukle was named Stučka, after Pēteris Stučka, from the time when it was established in 1960s until the fall of Communism in 1991, when it was renamed Aizkraukle.
 In the GDR, Polytechnic Secondary School No. 55 in Rostock was named "Peter Stucka" in honour of the Latvian Communist.

Works 

A comprehensive bibliography of the works by and about Stučka, with explanatory material in both Latvian and Russian, is:

Further reading

Notes

References

External links
Memorial to Pēteris Stučka in Riga at sites-of-memory.de

1865 births
1932 deaths
People from Koknese
People from the Governorate of Livonia
Latvian atheists
Latvian Marxists
Latvian jurists
Latvian revolutionaries
Soviet jurists
Old Bolsheviks
Russian Social Democratic Labour Party members
Central Committee of the Communist Party of the Soviet Union members
Executive Committee of the Communist International
Soviet Ministers of Justice
Russian Constituent Assembly members
Central Executive Committee of the Soviet Union members
Latvian communists
Latvian Socialist Soviet Republic people
Treaty of Brest-Litovsk negotiators
Riga State Gymnasium No.1 alumni
Saint Petersburg State University alumni
Burials at the Kremlin Wall Necropolis